The Toyota VZ engine family is a series of V6 gasoline piston engines ranging from  in displacement and both SOHC and DOHC configurations. It was Toyota's first V6 engine, being made as a response to Nissan’s VG engine, one of Japan’s first mass-produced V6 engines.

The VZ family uses a 60° V-angle design, and introduced many changes for Toyota, including various EFI, ECU, and engine improvements from generation to generation. The low angle DOHC and SOHC cylinder heads excel in low-mid torque and power, making the VZ series well-suited for various uses in cars, trucks, and SUVs.

The blocks are all strongly made using cast iron with large interconnected main bearing cradles and two bolt main bearing caps. Cylinder heads are made from aluminium. Forged steel crankshafts, and cast iron main bearing support girdles became standard with the 3VZ-FE. Piston and ring construction are typical parts, with rods varying between large and very large for stock V6 production engines.

1VZ-FE
The 1VZ-FE is a  version, produced from 1987 to 1993. It uses a DOHC layout with a cast iron block and an aluminium 24 valve head.

Applications:
 1988–1991 Toyota Camry Prominent (Japan only)
 1988–1991 Toyota Vista (Japan only)

2VZ-FE
The 2VZ-FE is a  version, produced from 1987 to 1991. It uses a DOHC layout with a cast iron block and an aluminium 24 valve head.

Applications:
 1988–1991 Toyota Camry
 1989–1991 Lexus ES 250

3VZ-E
The 3VZ-E is a  version, produced from 1987 to 1995. It uses an SOHC layout with a cast iron block and an aluminium 12 valve head.

Despite sharing an engine family designation with the 3VZ-FE, the 3VZ-E and 3VZ-FE only have few parts in common.

Applications:
 1988–1995 Toyota 4Runner
 1988–1995 Toyota Pickup
 1988–1995 Toyota Hilux
 1992–1994 Toyota T100

3VZ-FE
The 3VZ-FE is a  version, produced from 1992 to 1997. It is a revised variant of the 3VZ-E, mated with aluminium DOHC 24 valve heads. It retains the same bore and stroke, and has a forged steel crankshaft and cast connecting rods. The upper intake plenum is of the split-chamber design with Toyota's ACIS variable-intake system feeding three sets of runners for both heads.

Because the VZ series was originally for pickup truck and SUV use, the 3VZ-FE happens to be a physically tall motor. To make the engine fit in FWD engine bays, Toyota tilted the motor towards the firewall. This "tilt" is so severe (approximately ~15 degrees) that reaching the rear bank of cylinders is nearly impossible without first removing the intake plenum.

Parts-wise, the 3VZ-FE shares very little with the rest of the VZ engine family. The main bearings are shared with the 3VZ-E, but little else. Cams can also be interchanged between the 5VZ-FE and 3VZ-FE heads.

The 3VZ-FE was used on the Camry platform from 1992 to May 1997 depending on the market: North America saw the engine only in 1992 and 1993, while Australia and New Zealand had it from 1992 to 1996. This engine was available in some parts of Asia in the Windom until May 1997. Following 1994, the 1MZ-FE engines replaced the 3VZ-FE in most applications. However, the 3VZ-FE continued to be used in Australia until 1996, especially in the Camry. The Scepter (the Japanese version of the XV10 Camry) retained the engine until its discontinuation in December 1996. The power spread of the 3VZ-FE is wide, having close to maximum torque between 2500–4600 rpm, with power trailing off by 6000 rpm. The stock redline is 6600 rpm, and the ECU's fuel/ignition cut-off is 7200 rpm.

Compression ratio is 9.6:1.

The 3VZ-FE is fairly common in most parts of the world, having a long lifespan in popular models.

Applications:
 1992–1993 Toyota Camry (North America)
 1992–1993 Lexus ES300 (North America)
 1992–1996 Toyota Camry (Australia and Europe)
 1992–1996 Toyota Windom (Japan only)
 1993–1996 Toyota Scepter (Japan only)

4VZ-FE
The 4VZ-FE is a  version, produced from 1992 to 1998. It was built to replace the 2VZ-FE as Toyota's new 2.5 L V6. It uses a DOHC layout with a cast iron block and an aluminium 24 valve head.

Compression ratio of this engine was raised from 9.0:1 to 9.6:1.

Applications:
 1992–1996 Toyota Camry Prominent (Japan only)
 1993–1996 Toyota  Windom VCV11 (Japan only)

5VZ-FE

The 5VZ-FE is a  version, produced from 1995 to 2004. It replaces the SOHC 3VZ-E engine.

It has a cast iron engine block, and aluminium DOHC cylinder heads. The 5VZ-FE uses sequential multi-port fuel injection, has four valves per cylinder with shim-over-bucket tappets and features large cast connecting rods, one-piece cast camshafts, a cast crank (unlike the 3VZ-FE, which was forged) and a cast aluminium intake manifold. This engine also sometimes features an oil cooler (depending on application) and a wasted spark ignition system with three coils. Camshafts are belt-driven. It is a non-interference engine.

Applications:
 1993–2004 Toyota Land Cruiser Prado
 1995–1998 Toyota T-100
 1995–2002 Toyota Granvia
 1995–2004 Toyota Tacoma
 1995–2004 Toyota Hilux
 1996–2002 Toyota 4Runner
 2000–2004 Toyota Tundra
 2000–2002, 2004 GAZ-3111 Volga

See also

 List of Toyota engines

VZ
1988 introductions
V6 engines
Gasoline engines by model